Lists of humanities awards are lists that serve as indexes to articles about notable awards for specific areas of the humanities, academic disciplines that study aspects of human society and culture. Typically these lists give the country of the sponsoring organization, the award name, sponsor name and a description of the award criteria. Some of the awards have broad scope, or cover the intersection of different disciplines, so an award may appear in more than one list. A list of general awards in the humanities is followed by the lists of more specific awards.

General list

 List of general awards in the humanities

Specific lists

 List of anthropology awards
 List of archaeology awards
 List of awards for contributions to culture
 List of history awards
 List of language-related awards
 List of legal awards
 List of literary awards
List of literary awards honoring women
 List of poetry awards
 List of writing awards
 List of performing arts awards
 Lists of acting awards
 List of dance awards
 List of music awards
 List of theatre awards 
 List of philosophy awards
 List of politics awards
 List of religion-related awards
 List of ecclesiastical decorations
 Lists of art awards

See also

 Lists of awards
 List of media awards
 List of social sciences awards

References

 
Humanities